Gaius Fufius Geminus (fl. 1st century BC) was an imperial Roman senator who was appointed suffect consul for the period September-October 2 BC, as the colleague of Lucius Caninius Gallus.

Biography
Fufius Geminus was either the son or nephew of the Fufius Geminus who was governor of Pannonia in 35 BC. He was appointed consul suffectus in 2 BC (around September), replacing the Princeps Augustus. He was the co-author of the Lex Fufia Caninia, which restricted the manumission of slaves.

Fufius Geminus only served as consul for a couple of months – by 1 December, he had been replaced. It has been speculated that he may have died while in office, or perhaps he was caught up in the political events that surrounded the banishment of Augustus’ daughter Julia, resulting in his name being erased from the Fasti Magistrorum Vici.

Fufius Geminus was married to one Vitia; together they had a son, Gaius Fufius Geminus, who was consul in AD 29 and later put to death by the emperor Tiberius. Vitia was executed in the year 32 for mourning the death of her son.

See also
 List of Roman consuls

References

Sources
 Stern, Gaius, Women, Children, and Senators on the Ara Pacis Augustae: A Study of Augustus' Vision of a New World Order in 13 BC. (2006)
 Swan, Peter Michael, The Augustan Succession: An Historical Commentary on Cassius Dio's Roman History, Books 55-56 (9 BC-AD 14) (2004). Oxford University Press.
 Syme, Ronald, The Augustan Aristocracy (1986). Clarendon Press.

1st-century BC Romans
Geminus, Gaius (consul 752 AUC)
Fufius Geminus, Gaius (752 AUC)
Year of birth unknown
Year of death unknown